The 2001 Toyota Atlantic Championship season was contested over 12 rounds. The CART Toyota Atlantic Championship Drivers' Champion was Hoover Orsi driving for Hylton Motorsports. In this one-make formula all drivers had to utilize Swift chassis and Toyota engines. 20 different teams and 41 different drivers competed.

Calendar

Final points standings

Driver

For every race the points were awarded: 20 points to the winner, 16 for runner-up, 14 for third place, 12 for fourth place, 10 for fifth place, 8 for sixth place, 6 seventh place, winding down to 1 point for 12th place. Lower placed drivers did not award points. Additional points were awarded to the pole winner (1 point) and to the driver leading the most laps (1 point).

Note:

Race 2 no additional point for the qualifying were awarded due to rain, starting lineup based on combined practice times.

Race 10 Hoover Orsi had 14 points deduction (all points for his third place, but not the additional point for the pole) due to taking unjustifiable risk.

Complete Overview

R20=retired, but classified NS=did not start

See also 
2001 CART season
2001 Indianapolis 500
2001 Indy Racing League season
2001 Indy Lights season

External links
ChampCarStats.com

Atlantic Championship
Atlantic Championship
Atlantic Championship seasons
Atlantic